Daniel O'Leary (1875 – 23 December 1954) was an Irish nationalist politician and Member of Parliament (MP) in the House of Commons of the United Kingdom of Great Britain and Ireland.

He was stood for election unsuccessfully as the Irish Parliamentary Party candidate for the West Cork constituency at the January 1910 and December 1910 general elections. O'Leary was elected at November 1916 West Cork by-election, following the death of the incumbent All-for-Ireland League MP, James Gilhooly. He did not contest the 1918 general election.

External links

External links
 

1875 births
1954 deaths
Irish Parliamentary Party MPs
Members of the Parliament of the United Kingdom for County Cork constituencies (1801–1922)
UK MPs 1910–1918
People from County Cork